Driving Force is an American reality television program which premiered July 17, 2006, on A&E, and ended on May 15, 2007. It was centered on champion drag racer John Force and his daughters, also drag racers.

Synopsis 
The show is a reality television series starring John Force, a driver in the National Hot Rod Association (NHRA), along with his family: daughters Ashley Force, Brittany Force, and Courtney Force, and wife, Laurie.

The show's theme song is "Woman" by Australian band Wolfmother.

Revival 
At a press conference on September 12, 2013 in Charlotte, North Carolina, John Force announced the hiring of JMI, Octagon, and Rogers & Cowan Marketing and Entertainment Companies to help rebrand John Force Racing after losing Castrol and Ford as sponsors after the 2014 NHRA Season. Part of the rebranding effort will include a revival of Driving Force, though under a different name, and focusing more on Courtney and Brittany than the previous iteration of the show.

References

External links
 

2006 American television series debuts
2007 American television series endings
2000s American reality television series
Automotive television series
A&E (TV network) original programming
English-language television shows